The Beeston Junction–Hunslet Goods railway was a goods railway line in Leeds, West Yorkshire, England, promoted as the Hunslet Railway. It connected the Great Northern Railway main line with a new Hunslet goods yard, on the east side of Leeds. It opened in 1899, and was a successful expansion of goods facilities for the GNR.

It closed in 1967.

History 
In the last two decades of the nineteenth century, Hunslet had become a thriving manufacturing suburb of Leeds. Influential local business people proposed a railway branch serving the district, and in 1892 they approached the Great Northern Railway to see if the GNR would build a line. The GNR was favourably disposed to the idea, but the issue became complicated. The East and West Yorkshire Union Railway, an independent colliery line in the Rothwell area, was negotiating with the GNR at the time with a view to selling its concern to the GNR. The GNR was sceptical, unwilling to pay the price demanded by the E&WYUR. Possibly as a tactical ploy, the E&WYUR said it would build its own branch from its own network to Hunslet.

The discussions between the E&WYUR and the GNR broke down, and the smaller company did not proceed with its Hunslet branch. The field was clear for the GNR and the local promoters. Carter and Ramsden among the promoters sent the GNR firm details of their proposal in December 1892, a Parliamentary Bill having been prepared; the line would leave the GNR at Beeston.

The Bill passed in Parliament on 27 July 1893, and the Hunslet Railway was authorised, with share capital of £360,000. In December 1893 the GNR agreed to construct the line, and to deposit a Bill in the next session to absorb the company. The absorption Bill passed, receiving the Royal Assent on 3 July 1894. The route would cross the Aire and Calder Navigation. There were proposals to widen and deepen the canal so as to bring ships into Leeds, and a swing bridge over the navigation was provided for the purpose.

The GNR delayed construction, as it was in some financial difficulty at the time. During the period of dormancy, the North Eastern Railway announced in May 1896 that it proposed to build a Hunslet branch, approaching Hunslet from the north. The GNR and the NER investigated whether costs savings could be made by co-operation, but these could only be in the terminal area as the two railways would approach from different alignments. The GNR secured Parliamentary for an extension of time for the construction on 3 June 1897.

The line was opened for goods traffic on 3 July 1899; it never carried a passenger service. It was  miles long,  and it crossed the old Middleton Railway with a junction called Parkside. The Aire and Calder bridge had three large spans, of which the central span swung. There were exchange sidings with the NER branch from Neville Hill, which had been built in the meantime since the Hunslet Railway's own Act, but there was no through running connection.

General description

The Engineer (periodical) provided an extensive description of the works:

The station and sidings covered an area of 23 acres. There was a large warehouse with ten 30 cwt hydraulic cranes as well as a 30cwt and a three ton crane. The site was provided with 8,000 yards of sidings. the North Eastern Railway had constructed a short branch line from Neville Hill. The branch line was double track.

Closure
The section between Parkside Junction and Hunslet Goods closed on 3 January 1966, the remaining section from Beeston Junction to Parkside Junction closed on 3 July 1967. The swing bridge over the Aire and Calder Navigation was demolished in 1977.

Remains 

Hunslet Goods yard is (2019) used as a stone terminal for the Hanson company and is served from Neville Hill.

Notes

References

Sources
 Christopher Awdry, Encyclopedia of British Railway Companies, Patrick Stephens Limited, Wellingborough, 1990, 
 Martin Bairstow, The Great Northern Railway in West Yorkshire, published by Wyvern Publications, Skipton, 1982, 
 Ernest F Carter,  An Historical Geography of the Railways of the British Isles, Cassell, London, 1959
 Donald J Grant, Directory of the Railway Companies of Great Britain, Matador Publishers, Kibworth Beauchamp, 2017, 
 David Joy, A Regional History of the Railways of Great Britain: volume 8: South and West Yorkshire, David & Charles, Newton Abbot, 1984, 
 The Great Northern Railway: New Branch Line and Goods Station at Leeds, in The Engineer (periodical), Volume 88, November 24, 1899, pages 513 and 514
 John Wrottesley, The Great Northern Railway: volume III: Twentieth Century to Grouping, B T Batsford Limited, London, 1981,

External links 
 Map of the section between Middleton and Hunslet Goods
 Main pier of Knowsthorpe swing bridge

Railway lines in Yorkshire and the Humber
Rail transport in West Yorkshire
Great Northern Railway (Great Britain)
Transport in Leeds